Doudoub Bolole is a town in the Ali Sabieh Region of Djibouti. It is located 68 km south west of the capital Djibouti City, at an altitude of 560m.

Overview
It lies on the National Highway 1. Nearby towns and villages include Ali Sabieh, Djibouti City and Dikhil.

Demographics
The town inhabitants belong to various mainly Afro-Asiatic-speaking ethnic groups, with the Issa Somali predominant.

References

Populated places in Djibouti